Maha Bandula Bridge (sometimes spelled Mahabandoola Bridge) is a major bridge in Yangon, Myanmar built in 2001. It is named after General Maha Bandula, and crosses Pazundaung Creek just east of Yangon's central business district. It is accessed by Maha Bandula Road.

Buildings and structures in Yangon
Bridges in Myanmar
Transport in Yangon